Purnima Shrestha is a Nepalese mountaineer and photojournalist is  the first Nepalese women to successfully climb the peak of Dhaulagiri, the seventh highest mountain in the world.

Early life 
Shrestha was born in Arughat, Gorkha, Gandaki Province, Nepal. Growing up, she wanted to do "something big in life". Later she became a photojournalist. She is a member of the Photo Journalists’ (PJ) Club.

Mountaineering 
In 2017, Shrestha visited the Everest Base Camp to cover the Everest Marathon, she describes this event where she became attracted to the mountains. On 26 September 2017, Shrestha started her mountaineering career with Manaslu, the eighth-highest mountain in the world. Although she did not have any previous experience or training in mountaineering, Shrestha wanted her first climb to be on Mount Everest, but, after everyone told her to choose a smaller mountain she opted for Manaslu.

In 2018, she summited Mount Everest, her second eight-thousander. The next year, she climbed Ama Dablam. In 2021, Shrestha with six other women climbed the peak of Annapurna. They became the first Nepali women to reach the summit of  Annapurna. For their climb, the team received various honours. In October 2021, Shrestha with Pasang Lhamu Sherpa Akita both became the first women to successfully climb Dhaulagiri, the seventh highest mountain in the world.

References 

Living people
Nepalese mountain climbers
Nepalese summiters of Mount Everest
Nepalese female mountain climbers
Nepalese photojournalists
Nepalese photographers
People from Gorkha District
Year of birth missing (living people)
Women photojournalists